Bastila Shan is a fictional character and party member in the 2003 action role-playing video game Star Wars: Knights of the Old Republic, developed by BioWare and published by LucasArts. Bastila is a member of the Jedi Order, and plays a key role in the war between the Jedi-backed Galactic Republic, and Sith Forces led by the Sith Lords Darth Revan and Darth Malak, both of whom were originally Jedi. Bastila would eventually succeed in a desperate plan to defeat and incapacitate Revan, with the goal of molding the Sith Lord back into the light side of the Force. Towards the end of the game, Bastila falls to the dark side of the Force and sides with Darth Malak as his new Sith apprentice, though her final fate is ultimately decided by the player as Revan, who is revealed to be the story's amnesiac protagonist all along in a plot twist midway through the game's narrative. Bastila Shan was voiced by Jennifer Hale, with her casting being considered one of the most important among the game's characters. Bastila was originally envisioned as the descendant of a character from the Tales of the Jedi comics series but is ultimately developed with no ties to other pre-established characters.

Bastila is positively received by critics and fans, and her character arc is often considered one of the most important elements of Star Wars: Knights of the Old Republic. Jennifer Hale's performance as the character has also been praised. The character has remained popular with Star Wars fandom and has since appeared in several "top" lists.

Development

The character originated in pen and paper West End Games Star Wars RPG sessions held by the game's lead designer, James Ohlen. Early in the development of the game, Bastila's character and role within the narrative was originally concepted as Vima Sunrider, the daughter of Nomi Sunrider, a major character from the Tales of the Jedi comics series; this concept was later discarded. The character was briefly named Sareth Dorn before the name Bastila as well as the final costume design was taken from the Cathar Jedi companion, who was renamed Juhani.

The game is designed with an extensive branching narrative, where moral or immoral choices not only change the game's ending but also alter the way companion characters like Bastila responds to Revan as the protagonist of the story. Bastila's voice actress, Jennifer Hale recalled that Knights of the Old Republic was one of the earliest video games where a single character she plays could have two distinct moral positions within the same narrative, which could go either way depending on choices made by the player throughout the branching narrative. Hale had previously appeared in other Star Wars video games, and said she accepted the extensive opportunities for voice acting work in video games early in her career as it was considered laborious work that was unpopular with many actors; to her, the early 2000's was an exciting time for her to be involved in the creation of video games, and she considered Knights of the Old Republic to be at "the forefront of some of the really powerful cinematic stuff that was going on", as the entirety of the game is fully voice acted with extensive cinematic cutscenes. She appreciated the opportunity "to be given these powerful roles, and a place to lead, and to occupy characters that were leaders" such as Bastila, who happened to be female.

Hale used a British accent for Bastila, which is represented as the "Coruscanti" dialect in the Star Wars universe. She claimed that the accent comes naturally to her as she always thinks in various dialects in her mind, a skill which she has refined after studying dialects as a subject at high school, and training with vocal coaches on occasion throughout her professional career. Darragh O’Farrell, the voice-over director for Star Wars video game project for more than two decades, compared Hale to Liam Neeson, who played Qui-Gon Jinn in Star Wars: Episode I – The Phantom Menace, and remarked that she could give a strong and authoritative performance "without actually having to overtly put it out there—it’s just the demeanor that’s there".

Character
Bastila wields a double-sided yellow lightsaber and has access to a range of Force abilities which are available to a Jedi Sentinel. Bastila is known for her Battle Meditation, a rare ability usually only accessible by the most experienced Jedi Masters. She could influence the course of massive battles by bolstering the courage of one side of a battle while draining the resolve of another in tandem through sheer force of will. Within the game's plot, her importance is emphasized by recurring comments from non-player characters about her Battle Meditation ability, as the Jedi Order consider her to be a valuable asset to the Order.

Bastila is depicted as a brash, impulsive young woman in spite of the stern discipline instilled by her Jedi upbringing. She is depicted as a young Jedi grappling with both the enormous depth of her powers and her connection to Revan, whom she becomes increasingly intrigued with during their travels. Although she is tasked with guiding Revan back to the Jedi Code, she eventually began to question her role as being redundant. Bastila's side quest involves a potential reunion with her mother Helena; like most Jedi of the ancient order, Bastila was discovered to be Force-sensitive as a young child, and was taken away from her family to be raised within the order. If the player character is male, Bastila is available as a potential romance option.

While Bastila's character arc inevitably leads to her fall to the dark side of the Force, her ultimate fate may be decided by the actions of the player. Possible story outcomes include Revan joining forces with Bastila, Bastila being redeemed and returning to the light side of the Force, or she may be killed by Revan.

Appearances

Star Wars: Knights of the Old Republic
Bastila is first mentioned as the commanding officer of the doomed Republic ship the Endar Spire, which has been boarded by Sith forces who are in pursuit of her. She is later rescued by the player character from a criminal gang known as the Black Vulkars on the planet Taris. She escapes the destruction of Taris with the player character's party by stealing a crime lord's ship, the Ebon Hawk, prior to an orbital bombardment by Malak's forces. The Ebon Hawk and its crew is later captured by the Sith flagship, the Leviathan. Imprisoned along with the rest of the crew, Bastila later escapes captivity along with Carth Onasi and the player character. On their way to freedom, however, they were later intercepted by Darth Malak who revealed the player character's true identity as Revan. Bastila admits that she was part of a Jedi strike team sent to capture Revan, and when they managed to corner the Dark Lord, Malak chose that moment to betray his Master by opening fire on Revan's ship. Though Revan was severely injured and almost killed in the attack, Bastila managed to save Revan's life, thus forging a powerful Force bond between the two. Revan was brought to the Jedi Council, and was given a new identity and assigned to serve under Bastila on the Endar Spire.

Although Revan escapes with Carth, Bastila was held by Malak as his prisoner. After weeks of torture, Malak eventually succeeded in forcing Bastila to give in to her hate, and becomes his new apprentice. Bastila later confronts Revan atop an ancient temple on Rakatan world of Lehon, where she gives the former Dark Lord of the Sith an ultimatum to join forces with her. She is confronted again on the Star Forge, where she is defeated by Revan in a lightsaber duel; the player may choose either to kill her upon her request, or to spare her which leads to her projecting Battle Meditation in the Republic fleet's favor. With Bastila dead or in support of the Republic, the Sith fleet loses the advantage of Bastila's powers. The Republic destroys the Star Forge after Revan defeats Malak and the Sith starships fell into disarray. The Jedi reconvened following the battle, while Revan and the surviving crew of the Ebon Hawk were honored as the saviors of the galaxy.

If the player chooses to return to the dark side, Revan and Bastila turn on and kill the remaining Jedi party companions on top of the Rakatan Temple on the Unknown World. Before approaching the Star Forge, Bastila persuades the Republic to attack the Sith fleet stationed there. The Republic is under the impression that she would use her Battle Meditation against the Sith, but she uses it to turn the tide against them prior to Revan's final battle with Malak. Revan kills Malak, reclaims the title of Dark Lord of the Sith and takes Bastila as an apprentice.

Other appearances
Depending on dialogue options made by the player character during certain conversations about how the aftermath of the so-called Jedi Civil War in the first game affects the branching narrative for Star Wars: Knights of the Old Republic II: The Sith Lords, Bastila may make cameo appearances in the game, or be referenced by other characters such as HK-47.

According to the continuity established by the massively multiplayer online role-playing game sequel Star Wars: The Old Republic, Bastila is redeemed by a male Revan and survives the destruction of the Star Forge: continuing on the original game's romance subplot arc, the two fall in love, marry and go on to have a son. A year after the Star Forge's destruction, Revan, having remembered a great threat to the galaxy he discovered as leader of the Sith, sets out into the Unknown Regions, leaving most of his companions behind, including Bastila, who is at this point pregnant with their son, who she names Vaner in memory of his father. Two of her descendants, Satele Shan and her son Theron Shan appear in The Old Republic, which takes place 300 years after the first game.

Both the Jedi and Sith versions of Bastila are unlockable characters in the mobile game Star Wars: Galaxy of Heroes.

In September 2021, it was announced that Hale would reprise her role as Shan in Star Wars: Knights of the Old Republic — Remake, a remake of the original game developed by Aspyr.

Reception
In his book Star Wars: Knights of the Old Republic which explored the developmental history of the eponymous game, Alex Kane considered Bastila to be the emotional anchor and the "beating heart" of the game besides Revan, and credited Hale’s work on the character for much of the game’s resonance. Anthony Gramuglia from CBR described her as one of the game's most fascinating characters, noting her as a "morally gray figure" leading a complicated life. John Walker from Eurogamer said he liked Bastila as a character, in spite of her "nagging" and her voice being "a touch too snooty". Her romance subplot has been praised as a highlight. Conversely, Valerie Estelle Frankel considered her character arc to be "cliched", and the twist of her fall to the dark side "enfeebling" even though she initially comes across as a striking female character.

Bastila is a fan favorite character, having appeared in numerous "top" character lists and consistently ranks high in several Star Wars character popularity polls. Bastila was nominated among 25 other Star Wars Expanded Universe characters as a figurine design in the Toyfare 2006 Fan's Choice Poll. In a 2009 poll by Hasbro, Bastila Shan was selected as the winner. IGN placed Bastila Shan 62nd in their list of Top 100 Star Wars characters. In a 2020 fan poll organized by IGN for best Star Wars characters of all time, Bastila Shan placed 69th place out of 200 characters. Bastila is included in GameSpot's 2019 list of "15 Great Star Wars Characters Who Came From Video Games". The character is noted for being regularly featured in expressions of fan labor by fans of the game, such as cosplay activities and fan mod.

Interest in the character has increased in response to rumors about a potential adaptation of Knights of the Old Republic outside of the video game medium being in development. Corey Plante from Inverse suggested that American actress Angelina Jolie should play Bastila, as she possesses the necessary range to convey the character's nuances of "going from hero to villain and back again", and she is a "major player" in Revan's story as opposed to a supporting role. Brittany Vincent from MTV considers her to be a strong, independent female character who deserves more appearances and promotion in other Star Wars media. In response to the success of The Mandalorian and Disney's interest in producing more live-action Star Wars television content, Megan Crouse from Den of Geek argued that Bastila should be a point of view character as she "definitely has enough strengths and flaws to carry a TV series".

Some critics and fans have noted a visual resemblance between the character designs of Rey from the sequel film trilogy to that of Bastila, and that her character arc shares thematic similarities with that of Bastila's, including but not limited to the latter's Force bond and relationship with Revan, as well as her use of a yellow or double-sided lightsaber at various points in the films' narrative.

Analysis
Harry J. Brown discussed her importance as a character with agency in the game's plot, which he characterized as Aristotelian in dramatic structure, and noted that the game was awarded the 2004 Game Developers Choice Award for writing.

References

Bibliography

External links

BioWare characters
Star Wars comics characters
Star Wars Legends characters
Star Wars: Knights of the Old Republic characters
Female video game villains
Fictional prison escapees
Fictional swordfighters in video games
Star Wars Jedi characters
Star Wars Sith characters
Star Wars video game characters
Video game bosses
Video game characters introduced in 2003
Video game characters who can move at superhuman speeds
Video game sidekicks
Woman soldier and warrior characters in video games